Cyperus soongoricus is a species of sedge that is native to eastern parts of Kazakhstan.

See also 
 List of Cyperus species

References 

soongoricus
Plants described in 1841
Flora of Kazakhstan
Taxa named by Grigory Karelin